William Regan (1873–1934) was an English professional footballer who played in as a wing half in the Football League for The Wednesday.

Career statistics

References

English footballers
Brentford F.C. players
English Football League players
Association football wing halves
Sheffield Wednesday F.C. players
Fairfield Athletic F.C. players
Southern Football League players
Millwall F.C. players
1873 births
1934 deaths
Footballers from Leeds